Pseudopostega sumbae is a species of moth of the family Opostegidae. It was described by Puplesis and Robinson in 1999. It is known only from Sumba in Indonesia.

References

Opostegidae
Moths described in 1999